Charlie Barnett may refer to:
 Charles John Barnett (1790–1856), British Army officer and diplomat
 Charles James Barnett (1796–1882), English politician and cricketer
 Charlie Barnett (cricketer) (Charles John Barnett, 1910–1993), English cricketer
 Charles Barnett (cricketer, born 1884) (1884–1962), English cricketer who played for Gloucestershire
 Charlie Barnett (footballer) (born 1988), English football player
 Charlie Barnett (comedian) (1954–1996), American actor and comedian
 Charlie Barnett (actor) (born 1988), American actor
 Charlie Barnet (1913–1991), American jazz saxophonist, composer and bandleader

See also
 Barnett (surname)
 Charles Burnett (disambiguation)